The 2011 Lexus of Las Vegas Open was a professional tennis tournament played on hard courts. It was the third edition of the tournament which was part of the 2011 ITF Women's Circuit. It took place in Las Vegas, United States between 26 September and 2 October 2011.

WTA entrants

Seeds

 1 Rankings are as of September 19, 2011.

Other entrants
The following players received wildcards into the singles main draw:
  Julia Boserup
  Asia Muhammad
  Maria Sanchez
  Allie Will

The following players received entry from the qualifying draw:
  Vasilisa Bardina
  Gabriela Dabrowski
  Duan Yingying
  Krista Hardebeck

Champions

Singles

 Romina Oprandi def.  Alexa Glatch, 6–7(2–7), 6–3, 7–6(7–4)

Doubles

 Alexa Glatch /  Mashona Washington def.  Varvara Lepchenko /  Melanie Oudin, 6–4, 6–2

External links
ITF Search 
Official site

Lexus of Las Vegas Open
Party Rock Open
2011 in American tennis